Tantalus Peak is the highest peak (2,220 m) along the south wall at the head of Priestley Glacier, Victoria Land. So named by the southern party of New Zealand Geological Survey Antarctic Expedition (NZGSAE), 1962–63, because an attempt to establish a station there proved abortive due to steep ice. (Tantalus, son of Zeus, was punished for transgressions by "standing in water that ebbed when he would drink.")

Mountains of Victoria Land
Scott Coast